When Women Lost Their Tails is a 1972 Italian fantasy-comedy film directed by Pasquale Festa Campanile. It is the sequel of When Women Had Tails.

Cast 
Senta Berger: Filli
 Lando Buzzanca: Ham
Frank Wolff: Grr
 Renzo Montagnani: Maluc
 Lino Toffolo: Put 
 Mario Adorf: Pap 
 Aldo Puglisi: Zog 
 Francesco Mulé: Uto 
 Fiammetta Baralla: Katorcia

References

External links

1972 films
Italian fantasy comedy films
1970s fantasy comedy films
Films directed by Pasquale Festa Campanile
Films scored by Ennio Morricone
Prehistoric people in popular culture
Films set in prehistory
Italian sequel films
1972 comedy films
1970s Italian films